Toto, Fabrizi and the Young People Today is a 1960 Italian comedy film directed by Mario Mattoli and starring Totò.

Plot 
Two bourgeois families live in Rome: the family of the "Cavaliere del Lavoro" Antonio Cocozza, owner of a pastry shop, father of Gabriella, and that of professor Giuseppe D'Amore, father of Carlo. Carlo and Gabriella love each other happily, so when they think of getting married they want the two families to get to know each other. While the women make friends, Antonio and Giuseppe immediately begin to fight for anything, and the quarrels continue even when the couple have to choose the wedding dress, the house where to move, the organization of the wedding and reception. Gabriella and Carlo, tired of the constant bickering of the fathers, decide to run away, wanting to scare the parents, to get the wedding at all costs.

Cast
 Totò as Antonio Cocozza
 Aldo Fabrizi as Giuseppe D'Amore
 Christine Kaufmann as Gabriella Cocozza
 Geronimo Meynier as Carlo D'Amore
 Luigi Pavese as Il commendator La Sarta
 Angela Luce
 Liana Del Balzo
 Nando Angelini
 Carlo Pisacane as Il nonno
 Ester Carloni
 Serenella Verdirosi
 Franca Marzi as Matilde Cocozza
 Rina Morelli as Teresa D'Amore
 Renato Mambor as Ermanno Tazzoli

References

Bibliography
 Aprà, Adriano. The Fabulous Thirties: Italian cinema 1929-1944. Electa International, 1979.

External links

1960 films
1960s buddy comedy films
Italian comedy films
1960s Italian-language films
Italian black-and-white films
Films directed by Mario Mattoli
Films set in Rome
Italian buddy films
Films scored by Gianni Ferrio
1960 comedy films
1960s Italian films